Lapko is a Finnish alternative rock band from Harjavalta, formed in 1996. Lapko is notable for its popularity in Finland, with "radio play, explosive concerts, and voluminous critical accolades" even before releasing its debut on a well-known label, according to Allmusic.

Their first EP, Your Special K.O. (2003) was self-released. Their debut album The Arms (2004) was released by Jukeboss, but then they were signed to Fullsteam Records and albums Scandal (2006) and Young Desire (2007) saw them gain fame in Finland, reaching the national albums chart.

Members 

Ville Malja – vocals, guitar
Anssi Nordberg – bass guitar
Janne Heikkonen – guitar
Jussi Matikainen - drums

Discography

Albums

 The Arms (2004)
 Scandal (2006)
 Young Desire (2007)
 A New Bohemia (2010)
 ΓΟΛΕ (2012)
 Freedom (2015)

EPs

 Your Special K.O. (2003)
 Horse And Crow (2011)

Singles

 "Stacy" (2004)
 "All the Best Girls" (2006)
 "Barrel of the Past" (2006)
 "Killer Whales" (2007)
 "Hugging the Phone" (2007)
 "I Shot the Sheriff" (2009)
 "Summer Nights" (2010)
 "Love Is Sick And Wrong" (2012)
 "River Venom" (2012)
 "Money for Nothing" (2015)

External links
Official site
[ Lapko] at Allmusic.

Finnish musical groups
Finnish alternative rock groups